Berkley High School is a public high school in Berkley, Michigan.

Berkley High's colors are maroon and blue and the school's mascot is a bear. Berkley is well known for its college prep courses, high standardized test scores, and teachers and administrators. BHS offers 20+ Advanced Placement courses at its campus. Additional Advanced Placement courses and electives are available to students who elect to attend the Center for Advanced Studies and the Arts (CASA), an afternoon consortium school run jointly by Berkley and six neighboring school districts. Their newspaper is The Spectator, which is a member of the High School National Ad Network. Berkley's graduation ceremony is held annually at Meadow Brook Amphitheatre. The principal is Andrew Meloche. The assistant principals are Carolyn Cregar and Evelyn Coleman.

The current BHS campus opened in 1948 with 8 classrooms, and has expanded several times since. In 1949 a new classroom and vocational wing were added, 1955 brought another wing and a library/cafeteria. 1961 added a third wing of 18 new classrooms and two music rooms and in 1987 the 2000-seat Berkley Auditorium was opened as a hub for the schools many performing arts. 2003 brought the addition of the collaborative center which serves as a multi-purpose space. A major renovation occurred in 2016 and 2017 where the school was updated with new technology and building systems and a new main office vestibule.

Berkley High School has been accredited by the Michigan North Central Association Commission on Accreditation and School Improvement since the 1928–29 school year.

As of the 2012–13 school year, the school had an enrollment of 1,250 students and 74.6 classroom teachers (on an FTE basis), for a student-teacher ratio of 18.1.

Berkley High School was named to Newsweek’s 2013 list of 2,000 Best High Schools in the nation—ranked 22nd in Michigan. This ranking highlights the schools that have proven to be the most effective in turning out college-ready graduates. BHS has been on the Newsweek Best High Schools list since 2008.

The high school scored above state averages in all MME/ACT categories in 2013.

Performing arts

Berkley High School is home to a variety of musical ensembles. The wind ensembles are made up of the BHS Marching Band, Symphonic Band, Concert Band, and Jazz Band. Marching Band is only the first semester, and Symphonic Band takes its place second semester. Jazz band is also available for students. Jon Thomann became the band director in 2019.  BHS has three string orchestras, Sinfonia, Symphony Orchestra and Concert Orchestra, all lasting the whole year. The Orchestra program is under the direction of Ben Moy. In January 2009 and again in 2013, the Symphony Orchestra took first place at the Presidential Inaugural (Heritage Festival).  BHS also has four choirs: Concert Choir, Encore!, Belle Tones, and A Cappella.  Encore!, Belle Tones, and A Cappella are audition only. Julie Anne Smith directs A Cappella and Belle Tones. Sarah Noble directs Encore! and Concert Choir. All students from these organizations are able to collaborate through BHS' Musical National Honor Society, known as Tri-M.  In May 2007, the Berkley High School A Cappella choir was invited to New York City where they performed Beethoven's Mass in C Major in New York City's Carnegie Hall. In May 2013, the Berkley High School Symphony Orchestra and A Cappella Choir performed the American premiere of "My Name is Anne Frank" a cantata. 
In addition to the musical ensembles, BHS also has a drama program that is directed by John Hopkins.

Sports

Berkley's athletic teams currently compete in the Oakland Activities Association (OAA) with the exception of the Rugby teams (club) and the Junior Varsity hockey team (Southeast Michigan Prep Hockey League). Lori Stone became the Athletic Coordinator in 2012.

Although the school nickname is "The Bears," the boys' and girls' Swimming and Diving teams are known as the "Bearracudas" or "Cudas." Their basketball court is known as the "Bear's Den".

The Berkley football team, soccer teams, and track & field teams compete at Hurley field located less than a half-mile from the high school at Anderson Middle School. The field was renovated during the spring of 2002 and re-opened with many new facilities at the beginning of the 2002–2003 school year. The field was also updated in 2010 with a new track and 2012 with a new turf field. The field is also used for many other high school tournaments, community sporting events, and semi-pro soccer leagues. Next to Hurley Field is Pop Lewis field where the high school baseball games are held along with other community baseball leagues. The softball teams play at the two neighboring fields located south of Pop Lewis field. The tennis courts are also next to Hurley Field. Berkley Varsity Hockey and JV/Prep Hockey competed at the Berkley Ice Arena, which is also adjacent to Hurley Field and tennis courts, before it closed in 2016 due to a coolant leak, the hockey teams have since played the rest of the 2016–17 season at Joe Louis Arena. in the 17-18 season, the varsity hockey team played out of Oak Park, and JV hockey played out of Royal Oak. Since the 19-20 season, the hockey team has merged with Royal Oak and other surrounding area schools named "M1 Griffins Unified" and competes out of Royal Oak's John Lindell Ice Arena. The cross-country team competes at Catalpa Oaks County Park in Southfield and Memorial Park in Royal Oak. The golf team competes at Detroit Golf Club and won their league with an undefeated record in 2009. The bowling team competes at Hartfield Lanes. The Lacrosse team is known as M1 and is merged with Royal Oak athletics. The rest of the teams compete within the school building or outside (rugby) on other school grounds.

The BHS boys rugby team was the state champion in 2013 after an undefeated season, and the girls rugby team was state runner-up that year as well.

Notable alumni
 Curtis Armstrong (born 1953), Class of 1972, actor, best known for his role as "Booger" in the 1984 hit comedy movie Revenge of the Nerds
 Andy Bobrow television comedy writer and producer, Community, Malcolm in the Middle, 'The Last Man on Earth''.
Bill Bonds, Detroit TV anchorman
Marshall Crenshaw (born 1953), Class of 1971, singer-songwriter
 Electric Six, band, original members from BHS
Bruce Flowers, All-American high school basketball player, followed Notre Dame college career with brief NBA season with Cleveland.
Robert Gosselin (born 1951), former member of the Michigan House of Representatives.
 Steven Horwitz (1964–2021), Class of 1981, economist and author
 Jill Jack (born 1963), Class of 1981, singer-songwriter
Rachel Jacobs, CEO of tech company, killed in 2015 train accident
 Don Kirkwood, (born 1949), former Major League Baseball player
Andy Levin (born 1960), United States Congressman
 Andy Meisner (born 1973), Class of 1991, treasurer of Oakland County
Aric Morris (born 1977), football player, followed Michigan State University by playing for the NFL's Tennessee Titans and New England Patriots.
Dick Radatz (1937–2005), All-Star relief pitcher for the Boston Red Sox and other teams from 1962 to 1969
Robert Wittenberg (born 1980), member, Michigan House of Representatives
Gary Yourofsky (born 1970), militant animal rights activist

References

External links
 Berkley High

Public high schools in Michigan
High schools in Oakland County, Michigan
Schools in Berkley, Michigan
1922 establishments in Michigan